Gheorgheni is a municipality in Harghita County, Romania.
It lies in the Székely Land, an ethno-cultural region in eastern Transylvania. The city administers four villages:
 Covacipeter / Kovácspéter
 Lacu Roșu / Gyilkostó
 Vargatac / Vargatag
 Visafolio / Visszafolyó

Nearby are two natural sites, the Red Lake and Cheile Bicazului, a narrow canyon through the Eastern Carpathian Mountains forming the border with Neamț County.

History 

The city historically formed part of the Székely Land region of Transylvania. It was first mentioned in 1332.  It belonged to the Kingdom of Hungary with several interruptions, the Eastern Hungarian Kingdom and the Principality of Transylvania, administratively the town belonged to Gyergyószék. Between 1867 and 1918 it fell within Csík County, in the Kingdom of Hungary. After World War I, by the terms of the Treaty of Trianon of 1920, it became part of Romania and fell within Ciuc County. Since 1940, as a result of the Second Vienna Award, it belonged to Hungary again. After World War II, it became part of Romania. Between 1952 and 1960, it formed part of the Magyar Autonomous Region, then, of the Mureș-Hungarian Autonomous Region until it was abolished in 1968. Since then, the commune is part of Harghita County.

Demographics

As of 2011, the city had a population of 17,705, of which 86.13% (15,250) are Hungarians forming a majority. 1,988 or 11.22% are Romanians.
Demographic movement according to the censuses:

Politics 

The town council has 19 members as follows:

Twinnings
  Békés, Hungary
  Budapest 17th District, Hungary
  Cegléd, Hungary
  Eger, Hungary
  Kiskunmajsa, Hungary
  Siófok, Hungary
  Szigetszentmiklós, Hungary
  Bačka Topola, Serbia
  Alaverdi, Armenia

References 

Populated places in Harghita County
Localities in Transylvania
Cities in Romania
Székely communities